

Notable people with the surname Losse

Katherine Losse, American writer
 (b. * 1960), a German art historian
Thomas Losse-Müller (b. 1973), a German politician
Bettina Bähr-Losse (b. 1967), a German lawyer and politician